Betty Oyella Bigombe, also known as Betty Atuku Bigombe (born October 21, 1952), served as the Senior Director for Fragility, Conflict, and Violence at the World Bank from 2014 to 2017. She was appointed to that position in June 2014. From May 2011 until June 2014, she was the State Minister for Water Resources in the Uganda Cabinet. She was appointed to that position on 27 May 2011. During the same timeframe, she concurrently served as the elected Member of Parliament (MP), representing Amuru District Women's Constituency. She resigned both those positions on 1 June 2014.

Background and education
Betty Bigombe was born in Amuru District on October 21, 1952, back when it was part of Acholi District. She is one of eleven children by her father, who was a nurse. She is an ethnic Acholi. Bigombe attended Gayaza High School for her O-Level studies, graduating in 1968 and Trinity College Nabbingo for her A-Level education, graduating in 1970. She entered Makerere University, Uganda's oldest public university, graduating with the degree of Bachelor of Arts in Social Science, in 1974. Later she attended Harvard Kennedy School at Harvard University, in Cambridge, Massachusetts in the United States. She graduated with the degree of Master of Public Administration. Her studies at Harvard were sponsored by a Fellowship from the Harvard Institute for International Development.

Career
From 1981 until 1984, she worked as the Company Secretary of the Uganda Mining Corporation, a government parastatal company. From 1986 until 1996, she served in the Ugandan Parliament as a Member of Parliament. In 1988, she was appointed State Minister for Northern Uganda, which required her to take up residence in Gulu, the largest city in the Uganda's Northern Region. She was tasked with convincing the Lord's Resistance Army (LRA) guerilla rebels to lay down their arms, following the failure of military efforts to defeat the rebels. Bigombe initiated contact with the LRA leader Joseph Kony in June 1993. In 1993, she was named Uganda's Woman of the Year for her efforts to end the violence. Despite meeting with Kony, the talks collapsed in February 1994. Soon afterward, the insurgency intensified and no significant efforts towards peace would be made for the next decade.

Following a ten-year stint in the Uganda Parliament from 1986 until 1996, she failed to win the parliamentary seat for Gulu Municipality in 1996 and left government service. In 2011, fifteen years later, she bounced back by winning the parliamentary seat of Amuru District Women's Constituency, on the National Resistance Movement party ticket.

In 1997, following her graduation from Harvard, she took up employment with the World Bank in Washington, DC, as a Senior Social Scientist with the Post-Conflict Unit. Later, she served as a Consultant to the Bank's Social Protection and Human Development Unit. In 1999 and 2000, Bigombe provided technical support to the Carter Center in a successful mediation effort between the governments of Uganda and Sudan.

Following the February 2004 Barlonyo massacre, Bigombe took a leave of absence from the World Bank and flew to Uganda to attempt to restart the peace process. From March 2004 to 2005, Bigombe was the chief mediator in a new peace initiative with the Lord's Resistance Army, personally financing much of the logistics of bringing Ugandan government ministers and rebel leaders together. The last meeting on 20 April 2005, fell through. However, the failure of the Bigombe mediation is seen as laying the groundwork for the 2006–2007 Juba talks, which were mediated by the government of South Sudan. Those talks collapsed at the last minute when Joseph Kony refused to sign the peace agreement.

In 2006, she returned to the United States and served as a Senior Fellow at the US Institute of Peace in Washington, D.C. Later, she was appointed a Distinguished African Scholar at the Woodrow Wilson International Center for Scholars, also in Washington, D.C. In 2007, she received the Peacemakers in Action Award from the Tanenbaum Center for Interreligious Understanding.

She was appointed the chairman of the National Information and Technology Authority in Uganda (NITAU) in 2009. In May 2011, she was appointed by President Yoweri Museveni as State Minister for Water Resources, a position that she held until June 2014, when she resigned to take up her assignment at the World Bank.

Other considerations
Betty Bigombe was at one time married to then Uganda's ambassador to Japan. She is the mother of two children; Pauline and Emmanuel. In addition to Acholi and English, she speaks Swahili and Japanese.

See also
 Acholiland
 Acholi sub-region
 Cabinet of Uganda
 Lord's Resistance Army Conflict
 Robert Carmona-Borjas

References

External links
 Feature on Betty Bigombe by the International Museum of Women
 Arcadia Foundation
 Betty Bigombe is on the Board of Advisors of the International Peace and Security Institute.

1952 births
Acholi people
Ugandan women diplomats
Government ministers of Uganda
Harvard Kennedy School alumni
Living people
Makerere University alumni
National Resistance Movement politicians
People from Amuru District
Ugandan diplomats
World Bank people
Members of the Parliament of Uganda
Ugandan expatriates in the United States
Women government ministers of Uganda
21st-century Ugandan women politicians
21st-century Ugandan politicians
20th-century Ugandan women politicians
20th-century Ugandan politicians
Women members of the Parliament of Uganda
Ugandan officials of the United Nations
Harvard Institute for International Development
People educated at Trinity College Nabbingo
People educated at Gayaza High School